The Anchor Inn (now just 'The Anchor') is one of the oldest public houses in Digbeth, Birmingham, England, dating back to 1797. The current building was constructed in 1901 to a design by James and Lister Lea for the Holt Brewery Company. The terracotta on the façade is believed to have come from the Hathern Station Brick and Terracotta Company of Loughborough. On 10 December 1991 the building was designated Grade II listed building status, along with other nearby pubs such as the White Swan. The pub won the Campaign for Real Ale (CAMRA) award of 'Regional Pub of the Year' in 1996/7, 1998/9, 2003/4 and again 2007/8. The pub was taken over by Julian Rose-Gibbs in 2016, after being in the hands of the Keane family who ran it for 43 years.

Licensees

References

 
 
 Detailed history of this Public House

Pubs in Birmingham, West Midlands
1797 establishments in England
Grade II listed pubs in Birmingham